V100 may refer to:

 AdvoCare V100 Bowl (disambiguation), a series of bowl games sponsored by AdvoCare
 Cadillac Gage V-100 Commando, an American armored car used widely in the Vietnam War
 DB Class V 100, a West German class of diesel locomotive
 DR Class V 100, an East German class of diesel locomotive
 ESP LTD V-100, a guitar manufactured by ESP
 KDVV V100, an FM radio station in Topeka, Kansas
 Kamov V-100, a projected twin-rotor compound helicopter combat aircraft from Kamov
 Lenovo 3000 V100, a computer designed by Lenovo Group
 Motorola V100, a GPRS/GSM phone by Motorola
 Nvidia V100 Volta GPU microarchitecture top performer
 SMS V100, a 97 class (1914–15) World War I era German navy destroyer
 Sun Fire V100, a computer manufactured by Sun Microsystems
 Vought V-100, an attempt to produce an export version of the Vought O2U/O3U observation aircraft
 WKKV-FM, a radio station in the Milwaukee, Wisconsin area
 WVAF, a radio station in Charleston, West Virginia, in the US